Marugame Seimen (丸亀製麺), also known as Marugame Udon outside of Japan, is a Japanese fast-casual restaurant chain specializing in udon. The chain is operated by Toridoll Holdings Corporation based in Kobe.

Operation
As of June 2019, the chain has 786 chains across Japan. The chain also has 217 operations outside Japan, including in Singapore, the United States, the United Kingdom, the Philippines, Cambodia, Vietnam, Australia, Taiwan, Indonesia, Russia, South Korea, China, Hong Kong, and Thailand.

References

External links 
 
  (Toridoll Holdings)
  (Marugame Udon USA)

Fast-food chains of Japan
Japanese restaurants
Restaurants in Japan
Udon